Karl Alois, Prince Lichnowsky (also known as Carl Alois, Fürst von Lichnowsky-Woschütz; 21 June 1761 – 15 April 1814) was the second Prince Lichnowsky and a chamberlain at the Imperial Austrian court. He is remembered for his patronage of music and his relationships with Wolfgang Amadeus Mozart and Ludwig van Beethoven.

Life

Lichnowsky was born in Vienna as the eldest son of Prince Friedrich Karl Johann Amadeus  von Lichnowsky-Werdenberg (1720-1788) and his wife, Countess Maria Karolina von Althann (1741-1800). Although Lichnowsky spent most of his time in Vienna, it was actually in Prussia that he held the title of Prince. His estates were located in Grätz, in the Austrian part of the historic province of Silesia, most of which was conquered by Prussia earlier in the century. The location is today called Hradec nad Moravicí and is within the borders of the Czech Republic.

In his youth (1776 to 1782) he was a law student, studying in Leipzig and in Göttingen.  While in Göttingen he met Johann Nikolaus Forkel, who later was to become famous for writing the first biography of J. S. Bach.  Lichnowsky at the time began to collect works by Bach in manuscript copies. He also was a musician and a composer.

Lichnowsky was married (1788) to the former Maria Christiane Imperial Countess von Thun und Hohenstein, the "beautiful" (according to Otto Erich Deutsch) daughter of Imperial Countess Maria Wilhelmine von Thun und Hohenstein née Imperial Countess von Uhlfeldt, and of Imperial Count Franz Josef Anton von Thun und Hohenstein (born 1734), who later became an Imperial Chamberlain.

Lichnowsky was a Mason and a lodge brother of Mozart; see Mozart and Freemasonry.

He died of a stroke in Vienna on 15 April 1814.

Relationship with Mozart

In 1789 he traveled to Berlin, taking Mozart along with him.  For details of the trip, see Mozart's Berlin journey.

He also lent Mozart money, which Mozart was unable to repay.  This led the Prince to sue Mozart, and on 9 November 1791, a few weeks before Mozart died, the Lower Austria Court (Landrechte) decided the case in favor of the Prince, ruling that Mozart owed him the sum of 1,435 florins and 32 kreutzer, a substantial amount.  The court issued an order to the chamber of the Imperial court (Mozart's employer) to attach half of Mozart's salary of 800 florins per year.  The evidence of the lawsuit was uncovered (by Otto Mraz) only in 1991, and hence is not discussed in earlier Mozart biographies.

Relationship with Beethoven

Lichnowsky was one of the most significant aristocratic supporters of Beethoven.  In an 1805 letter the composer called him "one of my most loyal friends and promoters of my art."

In 1796, the Prince traveled to Prague, this time taking Beethoven with him.  The composer was on his way to Berlin.

In 1800, Lichnowsky gave Beethoven an annual allowance of 600 florins until such time as he found a regular appointment as a musician.  The stipend continued until 1806, when a furious quarrel erupted between the two, terminating their friendship: Beethoven, staying at Lichnowsky's country estate, had refused to play for visiting French officers. Later, arriving home in Vienna, Beethoven smashed a bust of the Prince.

Seven of Beethoven's musical compositions, all before 1806, were dedicated to Lichnowsky:

The three piano trios, Opus 1 (1795)
The "Nine variations for piano on 'Quant'è più bello' from Giovanni Paisiello's opera La Molinara", for piano solo, WoO 69 (1795)
The Piano sonata in C minor, Opus 13, "Pathétique" (1798)
The Piano sonata in A-flat major, Opus 26 (1801)
The Second Symphony (1802)

Notes

References

Sources
Clive, Peter (2001) Beethoven and his World:  A Biographical Dictionary.  Oxford University Press.
Deutsch, Otto Erich (1965) Mozart:  A Documentary Biography.  Stanford, CA:  Stanford University Press.
Grove Dictionary of Music and Musicians, article "Lichnowsky".  Online edition.  Copyright 2007 by Oxford University Press.  The article is by Elliott Forbes and William Meredith.
Nosow, Robert (1997) "Beethoven's popular keyboard publications," Music and Letters 56-76.
Solomon, Maynard (1995) Mozart:  A Life.  New York:  Harper Collins.

External links
Prince Lichnowsky page.
Genealogy: 15 generations of the Lichnowsky Family.

1761 births
1814 deaths
Austrian princes
Bohemian nobility
Karl Alois, Prince Lichnowsky
Wolfgang Amadeus Mozart's employers and patrons
Austrian patrons of music
Philanthropists from Vienna